Antonio Álvarez de Toledo y Beaumont, 5th Duke of Alba, Grandee of Spain, (in full), (1568 – 29 January 1639) was a Spanish nobleman and politician.

Biography
Antonio was the grandson of the Iron Duke Fernando Álvarez de Toledo, 3rd Duke of Alba and became 5th Duke of Alba when his uncle Fadrique Álvarez de Toledo, 4th Duke of Alba died without an heir. In 1599 Philip III of Spain awarded him the Order of the Golden Fleece.

He was viceroy of Naples between 1622 and 1629. As viceroy, he was confronted with multiple problems: yet another Italian War over the Valtellina valley; a bad harvest and high food prices in 1624; the 1626 Naples earthquake which killed nearly 10,000 people in the town; frequent attacks by Turkish pirates; and constant requisitions of funds and resources by Conde-Duque de Olivares, the prime minister of Spain.

In 1629, King Philip IV of Spain made him his Mayordomo mayor, chief of his Royal Household.

He married Mencía de Mendoza, daughter of Don Íñigo López de Mendoza, Duke del Infantado, and had three children: 
 Fernando Álvarez de Toledo (1595–1667), his successor
 María Álvarez de Toledo
 Ana Álvarez de Toledo

Sources

 
 
 

1568 births
1639 deaths
Viceroys of Naples
Dukes of Alba
Dukes of Huéscar
House of Alba
Antonio
Knights of the Golden Fleece
Grandees of Spain
16th-century Spanish nobility